The Autovía A-383 is a highway in Spain. It passes through Andalusia.

References

Autopistas and autovías in Spain
Transport in Andalusia